The ABIBA Solar Power Station, also Abiba Solar Farm, is a planned  solar power plant in Nigeria. The solar farm is under development by a consortium comprising Nigerian and European independent power producers (IPPs), and finance and investment firms. The off-taker of the electricity generated here is Nigerian Bulk Electricity Plc, for integration of the energy into the Nigeran electricity grid. An existing long-term power purchase agreement (PPA) governs the terms of sale and purchase of electricity between the sellers and buyers.

Location
The power station would be located in the city of Kaduna, in Kaduna State, in northern Nigeria.

Overview
The power station is a ground-mounted solar park. The design calls for maximum generation capacity of 50 MW. Annual generation is calculated at 82.5 GWh, to be sold to the Nigerian Bulk Electricity Trading Plc, for integration into the Nigerian grid. The energy is estimated to be adequate to supply 200,000 Nigerian households.

Work involves the laying of solar panels, installation of generators, transformers, inverters and connecting electrical cables to the new onsite substation. New high voltage transmission lines will be laid to transmit the power from the solar farm to a place where the electricity will be injected into the national grid.

Ownership
The table below, illustrates the shareholding in the power station, as of January 2022.

Construction
As of January 2022, the power station was reported to be in the "permitting stage", with construction expected to begin later the same year. The cost of construction is reported to be approximately US$91.25 million.

See also
 List of power stations in Nigeria

References

External links
 ABIBA solar plant , Kaduna As of December 2017.

Solar power stations in Nigeria
Energy infrastructure in Africa
Kaduna State